Shakti Singh Kaliyas alias Shakti Singh Chundawat is an Indian politician from the Bharatiya Janata Party and representing the Asind Vidhan Sabha constituency of Rajasthan. and He is State Secretary at Bharatiya Janata Yuva Morcha, Rajasthan.

Positions
 State Secretary at Bharatiya Janata Yuva Morcha, Rajasthan – present

References

External links
 Shakti Singh Kaliyas – Official Website

1974 births
Living people
Bharatiya Janata Party politicians from Rajasthan